Dr Rajdeep Roy (Bengali : রাজদীপ রায়; born 7 September 1970) is an Indian politician. He was elected to the Lok Sabha, lower house of the Parliament of India from Silchar, Assam in the 2019 Indian general election as a member of the Bharatiya Janata Party.

References

External links
 Official biographical sketch in Parliament of India website
  Personal Website

Lok Sabha members from Assam
People from Silchar
Bharatiya Janata Party politicians from Assam
India MPs 2019–present
Living people
1970 births